The Volusia County Fair and Youth Show is a combination fairgrounds and convention center located in DeLand, Florida.  It consists of two indoor arenas and two exhibit halls:

The arenas
It is used for sporting events, circuses, and concerts (capacity up to 4,500.), among other events.

Exhibit halls
The Townsend Livestock Pavilion features  of space at its exhibit halls.
Smaller trade shows are held at the Talton Exhibit Hall which has  of exhibit space.

All four are used either separately or combined for conventions, trade shows and other events, including the Volusia County Fair. All four have restrooms, concession stands, and state-of-the-art PA systems.

See also
List of convention centers in the United States

Other facilities
There are 102 spaces for RVs at the fairgrounds and lighted parking for 4,000 cars.

External links

Convention centers in Florida
Indoor arenas in Florida
Sports venues in Florida
Tourist attractions in Volusia County, Florida
Buildings and structures in Volusia County, Florida
DeLand, Florida